Gillespiea is a monotypic genus of flowering plants in the family Rubiaceae. The genus contains only one species, viz. Gillespiea speciosa, which is endemic to the island of Vanua Levu in Fiji.

References

Monotypic Rubiaceae genera
Psychotrieae